The Class 03 steam engines were standard express train locomotives (Einheitslokomotiven) in service with the Deutsche Reichsbahn.

History 
The Class 03 engines were built between 1930 and 1938 as express train locomotives for routes that were only suitable for axle loads of up to 18 tonnes. 298 examples of this engine, whose construction was based on the Class 01, were built by the firms of Borsig, Krupp, Henschel, and Schwartzkopff.

Its reduced weight was achieved by the use of a light sectional frame, smaller boiler and smaller cylinders. From engine number 03 123 onwards the pumps were located in the centre of the locomotive and from number 03 163 the locos had larger leading wheels.

Locomotive number 03 154 was equipped with a parabolic smokebox door, a tapered driver's cab and driving gear cover plates. Number 03 193 was given a wine-red, streamlined, full covering and a 2′3 T 37 St tender, in order to replace the Class 05. 03 204 and 03 205 had driving gear cover plates for experimental purposes. Locomotive numbers 03 175 and 03 207 had Lentz valve gear, also as an experiment.

Until 1959, 145  Class 03 locomotives were in the Deutsche Bundesbahn's operating fleet, of which 62 engines (03 005 to 03 122) had air and feed pumps on the smokebox, small leading wheels (850 mm diameter) and a top speed of 120 km/h, 16 machines (03 127 to 03 160) had air and feed pumps between the middle and rear driving wheels, small leading wheels (850 mm diameter) and a top speed of 120 km/h and  67 engines (03 164 to 03 296) had air and feed pumps between the middle and rear driving wheels, scissor-block brakes (Scherenklotzbremsen), large leading wheels (1,000 mm diameter) and a top speed of 130 km/h.

In 1968 there were still 45 units, now designated as Class 003, remaining in the operational fleet. They were stabled at the following locomotive sheds: two at the Braunschweig shed, six at Bremen Main Station, 13 at Hamburg-Altona, one at Husum, 16 in Mönchengladbach and seven at Ulm.

The last ten locomotives of Class 003 were on duty from 1971 at Ulm; in 1972 the last ones, nos. 003 088, 003 131 and 003 268, were withdrawn from service.

The DR in East Germany had 86 engines in its fleet. From 1962 they equipped their vehicles with mixer preheaters.

35 03 pacifics went to Poland after World War 2, along with ten streamlined 03.10s. The Polish version of the Class 03, the Pm2 (running number 34), can be seen at the railway museum in Warsaw.

The locomotives of this class had 2′2 T 30, 2′2′ T 32 and 2′2′ T 34 tenders.

See also
 List of DRG locomotives and railbuses

Literature 
 
 
 
 
 
 

03
4-6-2 locomotives
03
Borsig locomotives
Krupp locomotives
Henschel locomotives
Railway locomotives introduced in 1930
Berliner locomotives
Standard gauge locomotives of Germany
Standard gauge locomotives of Poland
2′C1′ h2 locomotives
Passenger locomotives